Charles Fletcher Dole (1845–1927) was a Unitarian minister, speaker, and writer in the Jamaica Plain section of Boston, Massachusetts, and Chairman of the Association to Abolish War. He authored a substantial number of books on politics, history, and theology.

Life
Dole was born May 17, 1845 in Brewer, Maine.
He was the son of Reverend Nathan Dole (1811–1855) and Caroline Fletcher Dole (1817–1914) and the older brother of Nathan Haskell Dole (1852–1935). He received a Bachelor of Arts from Harvard University in 1868 and a Masters of Arts in 1870. He graduated from Andover Theology Seminary in 1872 and married Frances Drummond of Springfield, MA, on March 4, 1873. He was a professor of Greek at the University of Vermont in 1873, a minister at Plymouth Church in Portland, ME, from 1874 to 1876. He was a member of the American Peace Society, the Anti-Imperialist League, 20th Century, Appalachian, etc. He got a Doctorate in Divinity from Bowdoin College in 1906.

Dole became an influential Unitarian minister and began in 1876 as the associate and took over as the settled minister in 1880 of the First Congregational Society of Jamaica Plain - Unitarian.  He served for forty years until 1916, when he was named minister emeritus.  Church records, Jamaica Plain. 

His son James Drummond Dole moved to the Territory of Hawaii in 1899 to establish a pineapple-growing empire, which would eventually become the Dole Food Company. At first, he lived with cousin Sanford Ballard Dole (1844–1926), who was the territorial governor.

Dole himself moved to Hawaii in 1909, where he was welcomed by the conservative community despite his progressive views,
and died there in 1927.

Publications
 The Citizen and the Neighbor (1884)
 Early Hebrew Stories (1886)
 Jesus and the Men About Him (1888)
 A Hand-book of Temperance (1888)
 The American Citizen (1892)

 A Catechism of Liberal Faith (1895)
 The Golden Rule in Business (1896)

 The Theology of Civilization (1899)
 The Problem of Duty: A Study of the Philosophy of Conduct (1900)
 The Religion of a Gentleman (1900)
 Noble Womanhood (1900)
 The Smoke and the Flame: A Study in the Development of Religion (1902)
 From Agnosticism to Theism (1903)
 The Theology of Civilization (1905)
 The Spirit of Democracy (1906)
 The Hope of Immortality: Our Reasons for it (1908, the Ingersoll lecture for 1906)
 What we know about Jesus (1908)
 The Ethics of Progress (1909)
 The Coming Religion (1910)
 The Burden of Poverty (1912)
 The Right and Wrong of the Monroe Doctrine (1912)
 The New American Citizen: The Essentials of Civics and Economics (1918)
 A Religion for the New Day (1920)
 Economics for Upper Grades (1920)
 The Victorious Goodness: An Epic of Spiritual Journey (1927)

References

External links
 
 

1845 births
1927 deaths
American Unitarians
Andover Theological Seminary alumni
Dole family
Harvard University alumni
People from Brewer, Maine
People from Jamaica Plain
Writers from Boston
Writers from Hawaii
Writers from Maine